Pseudooxynicotine oxidase is an enzyme with systematic name 4-(methylamino)-1-(pyridin-3-yl)butan-1-one:oxygen oxidoreductase (methylamine releasing). This enzyme catalyses the following chemical reaction

 4-(methylamino)-1-(pyridin-3-yl)butan-1-one + H2O + O2  4-oxo-4-(pyridin-3-yl)butanal + methylamine + H2O2

This enzyme contains one non-covalently bound FAD.

References

External links 
 

EC 1.4.3